Pseudo-panspermia (sometimes called soft panspermia, molecular panspermia or quasi-panspermia) is a well-supported hypothesis for a stage in the origin of life. The theory first asserts that many of the small organic molecules used for life originated in space (for example, being incorporated in the solar nebula, from which the planets condensed). It continues that these organic molecules were distributed to planetary surfaces, where life then emerged on Earth and perhaps on other planets. Pseudo-panspermia differs from the fringe theory of panspermia, which asserts that life arrived on Earth from distant planets.

Background 

Theories of the origin of life have been current since the 5th century BC, when the Greek philosopher Anaxagoras proposed an initial version of panspermia: life arrived on earth from the heavens. In modern times, panspermia has little support amongst mainstream scientists.

Extraterrestrial creation of organic molecules 
Interstellar molecules are formed by chemical reactions within very sparse interstellar or circumstellar clouds of dust and gas. Usually this occurs when a molecule becomes ionised, often as the result of an interaction with cosmic rays. This positively charged molecule then draws in a nearby reactant by electrostatic attraction of the neutral molecule's electrons. Molecules can also be generated by reactions between neutral atoms and molecules, although this process is generally slower. The dust plays a critical role of shielding the molecules from the ionizing effect of ultraviolet radiation emitted by stars. The Murchison meteorite contains the organic molecules uracil and xanthine, which must therefore already have been present in the early Solar System, where they could have played a role in the origin of life.

Nitriles, key molecular precursors of the RNA World scenario, are among the most abundant chemical families in the universe and have been found in molecular clouds in the center of the Milky Way, protostars of different masses, meteorites and comets, and also in the atmosphere of Titan, the largest moon of Saturn.

Evidence for the extraterrestrial creation of organic molecules includes both their discovery in various contexts in space, and their laboratory synthesis under extraterrestrial conditions:

Planetary distribution of organic molecules 
Organic molecules can then be distributed to planets including Earth both when the planets formed and later. If the materials from which planets formed contained organic molecules, and were not destroyed by heat or other processes, then these would be available for abiogenesis on those planets.

Later distribution is by means of bodies such as comets and asteroids. These may fall to the planetary surface as meteorites, releasing any molecules they are carrying as they vaporise on impact or later as they erode. Findings of organic molecules in meteorites include:

References 

Astrobiology
Origin of life
Speculative evolution